Stavchany is a village in Chernivtsi Raion, Chernivtsi Oblast, Ukraine. It hosts the administration of Stavchany rural hromada, one of the hromadas of Ukraine.

Until 18 July 2020, Stavchany belonged to Kitsman Raion. The raion was abolished in July 2020 as part of the administrative reform of Ukraine, which reduced the number of raions of Chernivtsi Oblast to three. The area of Kitsman Raion was split between Chernivtsi Raion and Vyzhnytsia Raion, with Stavchany being transferred to Chernivtsi Raion.

References

Villages in Chernivtsi Raion